Baidoa (Somali: [Af-Maxaa: Baydhabo, Maay: Baydhowy) is the largest city of the South West State of Somalia.

Between 2002 and 2014, Baidoa was the capital of the South West State. In 2014, the capital was changed to Barawa.

Overview
Baydhabo is the main hub of the Somali inter-riverine region and state capital of Bay Region. It was traditionally known as Baydhabo Jinaay (the heavenly Baydhabo) or ll Baydhabo (the spring of Baydhabo). The city was founded at the edge of the main highlands known as magniafulka where the ll springs originate, a prime grazing area. Legend states that a bird pecked the ground with its beak and would signal people to come and discover the pristine land. The shrine of Obo Esherow the patron Sufi mystic/saint of Baidoa has been honoured for over four centuries.

History

Antiquity
Baidoa and the broader Bay region is home to a number of important ancient sites. Archaeologists have found pre-historic rock art on the city's outskirts, in Buur Heybe.

Medieval
During the medieval period Baidoa was founded and settled by the Madanle clan and many traditions link the Ajuran with a people known to Somalis Madanle (Maaanthinle, Madinle, etc.) who were celebrated well-diggers in southern Somalia. Many traditions ascribe Madanle origins to Baidao and were attributed to stone-built rectangular enclosure in the deep interior so far adequately described. Baidoa is said to have solid stone and mortar walls ruins some four foot six inches high in places. This affirms the traditions that Baidoa during Ajuran was a large town and a trading hub center.

Early Modern

Baidoa was captured by Sultan Ibrahim Adeer who defeated the Madanle section of Ajuran and expelled them from the region. The city population was eventually replaced by Mirifle and the city reached its golden age under Geledi Sultanate rule. It was crossroads of caravan trade. Baidoa city was surrounded with large walls with one fortified gate. It attracted many merchants and farmers from the benadir coast to settle in what came to be known as (Buula Benadir) (the Benadir quarter). Menelik II of Ethiopia invaded Baidoa in the late 19th century, but was pushed back under Sultan Osman Ahmed rule.

Colonial Period
The Italians occupied the city in July, 1913. During the British military occupation (1941-1950), the Bardaale Quarter, where Somali clients and employees of the British lived, was the stronghold of the Somali Youth League; the rest of the city was held by the members of the Hizbiya Digil-Mirifle.

Modern
With an agropastoral economy, common livestock include goats and camels, with the main agricultural produce being sorghum. Pre Civil war Bay state was home to the largest camel population in Somalia, with above 1.3 million camels. Post independence, Baidoa would attract many international projects such as the Bay Agricultural Development Project.

Civil War
Baidoa incurred significant damage in the early 1990s, following the start of the civil war. In September 1995, United Somali Congress militia attacked and occupied the town. The Australian contingent of Unified Task Force  UNISOM1, running the Baidoa Humanitarian Relief Sector from January 1993, found themselves dealing primarily with the 'Somali Liberation Army' Duduble sub-clan of Aideed's USC. "They were able to provide an ongoing flow of funds to Aideed in Mogadishu from the proceeds of their activities in the Bay region, while enriching themselves in the process." They remained in control of Baidoa until around January 1996, while the local Rahanweyn Resistance Army militia continued to engage the USC in the town's environs. In 1999, the RRA seized control of the wider Lower Shabelle, Gedo, Bay and Bakool provinces. The town and larger region gradually rebounded to become among the more stable areas in the south.

In 2002, the RRA's leader Hasan Muhammad Nur Shatigadud founded the Southwestern State of Somalia regional administration, with its headquarters in Baidoa. The creation of the autonomous state was a move to show the RRA leadership's disaffection with the nascent Mogadishu-based Transitional National Government, which had been established two years earlier. In 2005, the Southwestern State was officially dissolved after its leader Shatigadud had joined the Transitional Federal Parliament in November 2004 and later became Minister of Finance in January 2005 in the Transitional Federal Government (TFG), the TNG's successor.

In early 2005, the TFG sent official delegations to Baidoa and Jowhar to assess the suitability of each city as a temporary headquarters for the TFG before an eventual relocation of government offices to Mogadishu. In June–July 2005, the Transitional Federal Government established an interim seat in Jowhar due to ongoing insecurity in the capital. To strengthen its presence in the town, the central authorities built an improved airport and inaugurated the Duduble Canal. The TFG later moved its temporary headquarters to Baidoa.

In December 2006, Ethiopian troops entered Somalia to assist the TFG against the advancing Islamic Courts Union, initially winning the Battle of Baidoa. On 28 December 2006, the allied forces recaptured the capital from the ICU. The offensive helped the TFG solidify its rule. On 8 January 2007, for the first time since taking office, President Abdullahi Yusuf Ahmed entered Mogadishu from Baidoa to engage in consultations with local business, religious and civil society representatives as the TFG moved its base to the national capital.

Following its defeat, the Islamic Courts Union splintered into several different factions. Some of the more radical elements, including al-Shabaab, regrouped to continue its insurgency against the TFG and oppose the Ethiopian military's presence in Somalia. Throughout 2007 and 2008, Al-Shabaab scored military victories, seizing control of key towns and ports in both central and southern Somalia. At the end of 2008, the group had captured Baidoa but not Mogadishu. In February 2012, Somali government forces and allied Ethiopian troops re-captured Baidoa from Al-Shabaab.

Southwestern State
In December 2013, a convention began in Baidoa between Federal Government officials and local representatives with the aim of establishing an autonomous state in the area under the Provision Federal Constitution. Two simultaneous political processes for the establishment of a new Southwestern State of Somalia were underway: one led by former Parliament Speaker Sharif Hassan Sheikh Adan, which proposed a three region state consisting of the Bay, Bakool and Lower Shabelle provinces; another led by convention organizer Malaq Ali Shino, former MP Madobe Nunow Mohamed and erstwhile Bay region Governor Abdifatah Geesey, which proposed instead the re-establishment of a six region Southwestern Somalia state consisting of the Bay, Bakool, Lower Shabelle, Gedo, Middle Jubba and Lower Jubba provinces.

Demographics
According to the UNDP in 2005 the population of Baidoa was 370,000. The city is situated at the center of one of the most densely populated areas in the nation. It is an ethnically and culturally diverse town, with many local residents originating from other parts of the country.

Additionally, Baidoa is the heartland of Maay, an Afro-Asiatic language principally spoken by the Digil and Mirifle (Rahanweyn) clans in the southern regions of Somalia. Its speech area extends from the southwestern border with Ethiopia to a region close to the coastal strip between Mogadishu and Kismayo. Maay is not mutually comprehensible with Standard Somali, and it differs considerably in sentence structure and phonology. However, Maay speakers often use Standard Somali as a lingua franca, which is learned via mass communications, internal migration and urbanization.

Climate
Baidoa has a hot semi-arid climate (Köppen BSh), as with much of southern Somalia. By contrast, towns in the northern part of the country generally have a hot arid climate (Köppen BWh).

Education
Baidoa has a large secondary school, from which around 580 pupils graduated per year in 2008. As of 2012, several other high schools were in development.

Tertiary education in the city is served by the University of Southern Somalia. After a considerable planning stage, the institution was established in 2007 by a group of Somali scholars and intellectuals. Inaugural classes began the following year, in August 2008. University representatives concurrently announced plans to develop four colleges: the College of Science, Agriculture, and Engineering, the College of Social Science, the College of Education, the College of Health and Environmental Sciences, and the College of Jurisprudence. Additionally, an Institute of Social Research is being developed. Plans are also in the works to construct a new campus in an area around 15 km north of Baidoa, as well as two new branches in two other principal cities in the Bay region.

Schools:
Sahal moalin ise primary and secondary school 
Baidoa Secondary and primary school
AlBasha'ir primary and secondary school
Alqalam primary and secondary school 
Baidoa model primary and secondary school
Hanano Community Primary and Secondary school
Ma'ruf Primary and Secondary School
Alcayn primary and secondary school 
Almacrifa primary and secondary school 
Ma'mur primary and secondary school 
AlHudda Primary and secondary school 
Alabraar primary and secondary school 
Baydhabo Janaay primary and secondary school
Salaam Institute of language and health Science
Alnajuum tertiary and primary school
Salaxudin primary and secondary school
City Model School

Transportation
Air transportation in Baidoa is served by the Baidoa Airport. The airport has fuel services, a terminal building, storage container, on-site warehouse, and radio towers.

Subdivisions
Baidoa is administratively divided into four districts:
Isha
Horseed
Berdaale
Howlwadaag
Daru salaam
Salaamey 
Towfiiq
Wadajir
Waaberi
Ideedi

Notable residents
Hasan Muhammad Nur Shatigadud – former Minister of Finance of Somalia and Rahanweyn Resistance Army leader
Sharif Hassan Sheikh Aden – Somali politician
Said Ali Hussein – Somali footballer; emigrated to the Netherlands as a result of the Somali Civil War.
 Ibrahim Hussein abdirahaman known as Fuudjeelle, -the Somali Social Positivism Union and the Pressure Group founder;
Ilhan Omar – American politician; lived in Baidoa prior to the Somali Civil War

See also
Battle of Baidoa

Notes

References
Iscia Baidoa: Somalia

External links

Administrative map of Baidoa District

Populated places in Bay, Somalia